The Washicoutai River is a salmon river in the Côte-Nord region of Quebec, Canada. It flows south and empties into the Gulf of Saint Lawrence.

Location

It widens at its mouth, and the estuary, dotted with islands and islets, provides a refuge for a wide variety of seabirds.
It is in the municipality of Côte-Nord-du-Golfe-du-Saint-Laurent in Le Golfe-du-Saint-Laurent Regional County Municipality.

Name

In the Innu language Washicoutai means "it overlooks the bay." 
The name is found for the first time on a 1685 map by Jean-Baptiste-Louis Franquelin, spelled "Ouasassacouté".
The name is also applied to the archipelago along the shore on each side of the bay.

Description

The Dictionnaire des rivières et lacs de la province de Québec (1914) says of the river,

Basin

It lies between the basins of the Musquanousse River to the west and the Olomane River to the east.
It is partly in the unorganized territory of Petit-Mécatina and partly in the municipality of Côte-Nord-du-Golfe-du-Saint-Laurent.
A map of the ecological regions of Quebec shows the Washicoutai River in sub-regions 6o-T, 6n-T and 6m-T of the east spruce/moss subdomain.
Land mammals include black bear, wolf and moose.

Fishing

The Washicouta, is recognized as an Atlantic salmon river.
In 2013–2017 an average of 47 salmon were reported caught each year.
The Pourvoirie de La Rivière Washicoutai provides outfitting services.
They have exclusive rights to the river, and provide a salmon sport fishery along a  stretch. 

Notes

Sources

Rivers of Côte-Nord